El Cielo en las manos is a 1950 Argentine film.

Cast

External links
 

1950 films
1950s Spanish-language films
Argentine black-and-white films
Argentine drama films
1950 drama films
1950s Argentine films